József Nagy (born 1 January 1988 in Szolnok) is a Hungarian football player who currently plays for Rákosmenti KSK.

His twin brother Sándor plays for Lombard-Pápa TFC.

References

External links
Profile on hlsz.hu 

1988 births
Living people
People from Szolnok
Hungarian twins
Hungarian footballers
Association football defenders
Ferencvárosi TC footballers
Kozármisleny SE footballers
Mezőkövesdi SE footballers
Kecskeméti TE players
Pécsi MFC players
Győri ETO FC players
Nyíregyháza Spartacus FC players
Rákosmenti KSK players
Nemzeti Bajnokság I players
Nemzeti Bajnokság II players
Twin sportspeople
Sportspeople from Jász-Nagykun-Szolnok County